Sara Errani was the defending champion but withdrew before the tournament began.

Tara Würth won the title, defeating Chloé Paquet in the final, 6–3, 6–4.

Seeds

Draw

Finals

Top half

Bottom half

References

External Links
Main Draw

Torneo Internazionale Femminile Antico Tiro a Volo - Singles